Inzombia may refer to:

 Inzombia (album), a 1995 album by Slant 6
 Inzombia (mixtape), a 2016 mixtape by Belly